Notable people with the surname Yousfi include:

Abderrahmane Yousfi (born 1994), Algerian footballer
Mohamed Ali Yousfi (born 1950), Tunisian writer and translator
Mohamed El Yousfi (born 1991), Moroccan footballer
Mushtaq Ahmed Yousfi (1923–2018),  Pakistani satire writer
Omar Yousfi (born 1956), Algerian weightlifter
Youcef Yousfi (born 1941), Algerian politician, Minister of Energy and Mines in 2010-2015

Surnames of Arabic origin